Ognyanovo is a village in Pazardzhik Municipality, Pazardzhik Province, southern Bulgaria.  it has 2,604 inhabitants. The village is situated on the main railway between Sofia and Plovdiv. There is a lime factory.

References

Villages in Pazardzhik Province